Michal Ravitz Lurie (born ) is an Israeli football defender.

Club career
Ravitz had played in the Israeli First League for Maccabi Haifa, Maccabi Holon, ASA Tel Aviv University and Maccabi Kishronot Hadera, winning 8 league championships and 8 national cups and playing in UEFA Women's Champions League.
Ravitz also Attended University of the Incarnate Word in 2006 and 2007 and St Mary's University, missing 2008 through injury.

International career
Ravitz played for the national team since 2005, appearing in 37 matches. Previously, between 2002 and 2005, Ravitz played for the U-19 national team, appearing in 11 matches, scoring 1 goal.

Honours
Championships (8):
With Maccabi Haifa: 2001–02
With Maccabi Holon: 2004–05, 2005–06, 2006–07 , 2008–09 
With ASA Tel Aviv University: 2010–11, 2011–12 , 2012–13
Cup (8):
With Maccabi Haifa: 2001–02
With Maccabi Holon: 2004–05, 2005–06, 2006–07 , 2008–09 , 2009–10
With ASA Tel Aviv University: 2011–12
With Maccabi Kishronot Hadera: 2014–15

References

External links

1986 births
Living people
Israeli Ashkenazi Jews
Israeli women's footballers
Israel women's international footballers
Maccabi Haifa F.C. (women) players
Maccabi Holon F.C. (women) players
ASA Tel Aviv University players
Maccabi Kishronot Hadera F.C. players
Women's association football defenders
Footballers from Haifa